SAP Business One is a business management software (ERP) designed for small and medium-sized enterprises, sold by the German company SAP SE. As an ERP solution, it aims to automate key business functions in financials, operations, and human resources.

History 
SAP Business One was initially launched in Israel in 1996 under the name "Menahel" ("manager") or "TopManage", for countries out of Israel. The company was founded by Reuven Agassi (CEO) and Gadi Shamia (VP of sales, marketing and product). The product was designed by Gadi Shamia and the head developer was Hilla Mazinter.

In its first years, TopManage was sold in the Israeli market only and was the first Windows/Mac business management product to be offered in the Israeli market. In 2000 TopManage started its global expansion into markets in Europe and Latin America.

In March 2002, SAP purchased "TopManage" financial systems and branded their system as SAP Business One. TopManage founders Reuven Agassi and Gadi Shamia were given executive positions at SAP following the acquisition. A year earlier, TopManage's sister company "TopTier" had also been acquired by SAP. TopTier was founded by Reuven Agassi's son Shai Agassi.

The acquisition allowed SAP to reach out to the small market through its partners and also to gain additional business from the smaller subsidiaries of its enterprise customers.

Releases 
The history of SAP Business One:

Prior to SAP Business One 2004, specific country versions called 6.x existed until the first global release in 2004.

Features (modules) 
SAP Business One is arranged into 15 functional modules, covering the typical functions in a business organization. The most widely used modules are financials, sales opportunities, sales – A/R, purchasing A/P, business partners, banking and inventory.

 Administration, where the setup of the various core settings in the application are done
 CRM, where common sales employee tasks link to the other modules (NB: The module is purely here for usability and offer no new features of its own) (only SAP 9.3 and higher)
 Financials, where the definition of Chart of Account is set up and the core journal entries can be created
 Opportunities, where Lead generation is used to keep track of potential sales and purchases
 Sales - A/R, where the sales flow (Quotation > Order > Delivery > AR Invoice) are managed
 Purchasing - A/P, where the purchase flow (Quotation > Order > GRPO > AP Invoice) are managed
 Business Partners, where master data of Leads, Customer and Supplier are maintained/

 Banking, where payment of Incoming (sales) and Outgoing (purchase) payments are created
 Inventory, where master data of goods to be sold/purchased are maintained and their quantity/value in warehouses are tracked
 Resources, where master data of resources (machines and people) to be used in production are defined (capacity and planning) (only SAP 9.1 and higher)
 Production, where Bill of Materials master data is maintained and Production orders are created
 Project Management, where you define projects (what you do when) (only SAP 9.2 and higher)
 Material Requirements Planning (MRP), where forecasts of needed items in sales/production are defined in order to make purchase order recommendations
 Service, where management of service contracts are maintained and service calls are created
 Human Resources, where employee master data (names, contact information, roles, etc.) are maintained

Each module handled specific business tasks on its own, but is linked to the other modules where applicable. For instance, an invoice from the billing transaction of Sales & Distribution would pass through to accounting, where it will appear in accounts receivable and cost of goods sold.

Architecture 
SAP Business One is a typical Client–server model software product.

Client software is primarily the SAP Business One client that is a Microsoft Windows-based product that connects to a back-end server. SAP also offers clients for phones and tablets (iOS and Android) that contain a subset of the full features aimed at sales employees.
Server software is run on either a Microsoft SQL Server database (Windows) or SAP HANA database (Linux).

Partners and community 
SAP Business One is delivered through its global partner network (SAP PartnerEdge) consisting of the following partner types:

 Value-Added Resellers (VAR) is an SAP partner that sells, implements and supports the product to end customers.
 Software Solution Partners (SSP) is an SAP partner that creates horizontal or vertical standard solutions on top of the SAP Business One platform with the SAP Business One SDK and sells them via the VAR partners.
 Open Ecosystem Once you join you will be able to sell, service, and market SAP-approved products available through its distributor channel. It's free and easy to join, with only a small amount of required training to complete before you begin.

Extensibility 
Custom development (called add-ons) are done using the SAP Business One SDK. It is COM-based development done in Microsoft Visual Studio with C# or VB.NET.

SAP Business One SDK consists of:
 Data Interface API (DI-API), where you can create new business object around the normal SAP Business One client but still adhere to the core business rules
 User interface API (UI-API), where you can modify existing SAP Business One client screens, create new screens and change/block the normal event flow
 SAP Business One Integration Technology (B1i), where you can visually create Business flows using XML/XSLT
 Service Layer for SAP HANA, where you can, using OData, create business objects
Service Layer for Microsoft SQL Server, where you can, using OData, create business objects

See also 
 List of ERP vendors

References

External links 
 
 The History of SAP Business One on LinkedIn

Accounting software
Customer relationship management software
ERP software
Business One